The 2007 Las Vegas mayoral election took place on April 3, 2007 to elect the mayor of Las Vegas, Nevada. The election was held concurrently with various other local elections, and was officially nonpartisan.

Incumbent Mayor Oscar Goodman, a Democrat in office since 1999, received a majority of votes in the first round of the election, and was reelected to a third term in office with no need for a runoff. Perennial candidate Tom McGowan came in a distant second place.

Results

References

2007
2007 Nevada elections
2007 United States mayoral elections